Hovhannes Hambardzumyan (born 4 October 1990) is an Armenian professional footballer who plays as a right back for Cypriot club Anorthosis and the Armenia national football team.

Club career
Hambardzumyan was a student of the football school Banants Yerevan, becoming one of the children of the club. Initially he played in the first division for Banants-2. In the 2008 season, he had one match for Banants in the Armenian Premier League. His debut took place on 23 August in a game against the guest Ararat Yerevan and ended with the defeat of Banants - 0:1. Hambardzumyan came in on the 84th minute of the match, replacing Seven Muradyan. As of next season, Hambardzumyan was regularly exposed to the participation for matches like the Armenian Premier League and the Armenian Cup. Banants became the finalists of the Armenian Cup for three seasons in 2008, 2009 and 2010. In the 2010 season, by participating in three events held under the regulation of the Football Federation of Armenia, Banants came in second in the Premier League, Cup and Armenian Supercup.

On 18 June 2014, Hambardzumyan signed a 2-year contract with Macedonian side FK Vardar. At the end of the 2014/2015 season, Hambardzumyan was voted player of the year in Macedonia. In July 2015, Hambardzumyan started both UEFA Champions League qualification matches against APOEL FC.

Career statistics

Club

International career
With the introduction of the core team at the club, Hambardzumyan was invited to the Armenia U-19 youth team, for which he played for a little more than two years 7 matches. This was followed by an invitation already from the Armenia U-21 junior coaching department. He debuted for the second team on 4 September 2009 against peers from Switzerland U-21. Hambardzumyan left to the field after the break in the second half, replacing Artak Yedigaryan. The Armenian team was defeated 1–3. The second match was played against the Estonia U-21 team on 20 May next year. However, in this match, Hambardzumyan was released only in the 88th minute of the game, coming out on the field in place of Edgar Malakyan. The final score was 2:3 in favor of the youth national team of Estonia. Only in the third match of Hambardzumyan was he entrusted a place in the first team. The junior team played sensationally in the match and defeated Montenegro U-21 4:1. The entire team, including Hambardzumyan, were awarded high marks.

Hambardzumyan debuted in the Armenia national football team after he got called for the UEFA Euro 2012 qualifying matches. The first game of this series took place against Ireland, with Hambardzumyan coming in as substitute in the 71st minute for Artak Yedigaryan. But the debut match for the national team held on 11 August, against the national team of Iran, ended in a defeat. Ambartsumian left in the field for 76 minutes, replacing Aghvan Mkrtchyan.

International goals 
As of match played 18 November 2020. Armenia score listed first, score column indicates score after each Hambardzumyan goal. Score and Result show Armenia's goal tally first.

Honours

Club
Banants Yerevan
Armenian Premier League
Winner: 2013–14
Runner-up: 2010–11
Armenian Cup
Runner-up: 2008-9, 2009–10, 2010–11
Armenian Super Cup
Runner-up: 2008–9, 2010–11

Vardar
Macedonian First League
Winner: 2014–15, 2015–16, 2016–17
Macedonian Super Cup
Winner: 2015

Anorthosis
Cypriot Cup
Winner: 2020–21

References

External links
 
 FFA.am
 
 

1990 births
Living people
Armenian footballers
Footballers from Yerevan
Association football defenders
Armenia international footballers
FC Urartu players
Armenian Premier League players
Enosis Neon Paralimni FC players
Armenian expatriate footballers
FK Vardar players
Expatriate footballers in North Macedonia
Expatriate footballers in Cyprus